Kupriyanovo is a rural locality (a village) in Kupriyanovskoye Rural Settlement, Gorokhovetsky District, Vladimir Oblast, Russia. The population was 157 as of 2010. There are 3 streets.

Geography 
Kupriyanovo is located 8 km south of Gorokhovets (the district's administrative centre) by road. Vetelnitsy is the nearest rural locality.

References 

Rural localities in Gorokhovetsky District